Marcos Rogério da Silva Brito (born 7 July 1978) more commonly known as Marcos Rogério is a federal senator of Brazil representing his home state of Rondônia. He previously served in the chamber of deputies from 2011 to 2019.

Personal life
Marcos Rogério was born to Samuel Lopes de Brito and Maria Cecilia da Silva.  Prior to becoming a politician, Marcos Rogério worked as a journalist for Rede Globo. He is a graduate of Universidade Luterana do Brasil. Marcos Rogério is an Evangelical Christian, and belongs to the Pentecostal denomination Assembleias de Deus.

Political career
Marcos Rogério voted in favor of the impeachment motion of then-president Dilma Rousseff. He would later vote in favor of opening a similar corruption investigation against Rousseff's successor Michel Temer, and voted in favor of the 2017 Brazilian labor reforms.

In the 2018 Brazilian general election Marcos Rogério was elected to the federal senate with 324,939 votes. He was one of six new Evangelical members elected to the federal senate in that election.

References

1978 births
Living people
People from Ji-Paraná
Brazilian Pentecostals
Brazilian journalists
Brazilian radio personalities
Brazil Union politicians
Democrats (Brazil) politicians
Democratic Labour Party (Brazil) politicians
Members of the Federal Senate (Brazil)
Members of the Chamber of Deputies (Brazil) from Rondônia